Rhembastus variabilis is a species of leaf beetle. It is distributed in South Africa, Mozambique, the Democratic Republic of the Congo, Sudan, and West Africa as far as Guinea and Ivory Coast. It was described by the German entomologist Edgar von Harold in 1877.

References

Eumolpinae
Beetles of the Democratic Republic of the Congo
Insects of South Africa
Insects of Mozambique
Insects of Sudan
Insects of West Africa
Beetles described in 1877
Taxa named by Edgar von Harold